A New World may refer to:

"A New World" (Angel), an episode of Angel
A New World (EP), an EP by Ronnie Drew
Symphony No. 9 - From the New World, a symphony by Dvorak
A New World, a novel by Amit Chaudhuri
A New World: A Life of Thomas Paine, a play by Trevor Griffiths
A New World (album), an album by Maksim Mrvica
A New World, an EP by electro house producer Mord Fustang